Tough Love is a web series that premiered on YouTube on November 8, 2015. The series started as a micro budget project that eventually attracted more than 45,000 unique viewers with over 1 million channel views.

Tough Love received three nominations at the New York Web Fest in 2016. It was nominated for a Daytime Emmy Award in 2017 for Outstanding Digital Daytime Drama Series.

Plot 
Tough Love follows six millennials in New York City as they navigate dating and life's other challenges.

Cast

Series regulars 
 Ebony Obsidian as Alicia Davis
 Jordan Ryan Barton as Quincy Scott
 Natalie Jacobs as Monica Lee
 Verina Banks as Jordan Samuels
 Bradley Clarke as Jackson Thomas
 Devin Coleman as Darius Wilson

Guest
 Dorien Wilson as Dr. Singleton

Reception
Tough Love has over 1 million views on YouTube. Essence named it as one of the "7 Best Black Web Series of 2016", and Maurita Salkey of Revolt called the series' characters "unforgettable".

Tough Love has been praised by Ebony, Blavity, and BRIC TV.

Awards and nominations

References 

2000s American television series
2015 web series debuts
American drama web series
Internet soap operas